Snakeoil is an album by the American composer and saxophonist Tim Berne released on the ECM label in 2012.

Reception

The AllMusic review by Thom Jurek awarded the album 4 stars and stated "Snakeoil is unlike any recording in Berne's large catalog. The lack of physical force (though there is plenty of fire) is more than compensated for, in the thought-provoking concept and complexity with a resonant yet unconventional lyricism".

Writing in The Guardian, John Fordham commented "It's a terrific set, and an object lesson in balancing composition, improvisation and the tonal resources of an acoustic band".

The All About Jazz review by John Kelman said "That Berne and his group succeed in creating a context where freedom to coexist in such particularly seamless confluence makes Snakeoil a milestone in the saxophonist's career. The virtuosity of the quartet is never in question, and yet there's a refreshing lack of posturing and an "egos at the door" service to the music".

The JazzTimes review by Nate Chinen said "Snakeoil is a magnificent album, a standout not only in his lengthy discography but also in the recent outpouring of left-of-center jazz releases. In its carefully shifting balance of finely wrought composition and open improvisation, it reflects both a longstanding priority for Berne and a current preoccupation in modern jazz. In its impressive execution, it reflects something else: Berne’s tireless pursuit of the limber durability that can only come from the right kind of working band".

Track listing
All compositions by Tim Berne
 "Simple City" - 13:56   
 "Scanners" - 7:21   
 "Spare Parts" - 14:10   
 "Yield" (Matt Mitchell) - 12:02   
 "Not Sure" - 8:39   
 "Spectacle" - 12:02

Personnel
Tim Berne – alto saxophone
Oscar Noriega – B clarinet, bass clarinet
Matt Mitchell – piano
Ches Smith – drums, percussion

References

ECM Records albums
Tim Berne albums
2012 albums
Albums produced by Manfred Eicher